The Bopps are a children's musical group formed in the south west of England in 2010. Their members are Stan Cullimore, Keith Littler, Mike Cross and Joanna Ruiz.

Formation
Stan Cullimore was previously a member of the pop band The Housemartins who were popular during the 1980s. Other members of The Housemartins include Norman Cook otherwise known as Fatboy Slim and Paul Heaton who went on to form The Beautiful South. Since then Stan Cullimore has been involved in the production of children's television and music for such clients as Nickelodeon, CBeebies and CITV.

Keith Littler has run a successful pre-school television production company - The Little Entertainment Group  for many years. Amongst his works are Little Red Tractor which is broadcast in the UK by BBC, TV drama Roman Mysteries BBC and Merlin the Magical Puppy (cITV).

Joanna Ruiz has worked as a voice actress and has spent her time providing voice talent work for children's animation. Amongst her works are Make Way for Noddy, Everything's Rosie, Hana's Helpline, Fireman Sam, Horrid Henry and Bananas in Pyjamas. She left the group years later to focus on her voice acting career.

The tale of The Bopps
From The Bopps Website

Television series
The Bopps first went on air in the United Kingdom on 5 April 2010 on the children's channel Nick Jr.

Discography

Albums
The Bopps - The Bopping Tunes from the TV Series (2010)

Singles
"The Bopps Theme", "Best Friend", "Numbers", "Toy Box", "Park", "Dance", "Hoppity Hop", "Noisy Nigel", "Jelly Shoes", "Sunshine" and "Ghost Song" (December 2010)

References

External links
Official website
The Bopps on Nick Jr
Nick Jr

British preschool education television series
Nick Jr. original programming
British children's musical groups
2010 British television series debuts
2010s British children's television series